Young Lakes are three lakes, north of Tuolumne Meadows, in Yosemite National Park, California.

Important facts

Note the following:

 The trailhead is in Tuolumne Meadows, at elevation ,
 The best seasons is summer, through fall; this depends on snowfall, so check with a ranger ,
 There are campsites at:
 North side of Lower,
 Middle Lakes,
 northwest side of upper lake,
 Activities: Fishing, photography, cross-country explorations, peak climbing

The lakes are located between Ragged Peak and White Mountain. Other nearby peaks are Sheep Peak, North Peak, and Mount Conness, and the trail provides great views of countless more distant summits to the south, of the Cathedral Range.

References

External links and references

 On the trail, is detailed, has geographic coordinates
 On the trail
 More on the trail
 NPS site, details on quotas
 More on Young Lakes
 More, with many photos
 Wilderness Skills Backpack: Young Lakes and Mount Conness
 On horseback-riding to Young Lakes

Lakes of Yosemite National Park
Tourist attractions in Mariposa County, California